Sinowilsonia is a monotypic genus of plant containing the single species Sinowilsonia henryi. It is endemic to China. It is threatened by habitat loss. It is available from specialized commercial nurseries.

References

External links

Flora of China

Monotypic Saxifragales genera
Hamamelidaceae
Endemic flora of China
Near threatened plants
Taxonomy articles created by Polbot